The Tamil Filmfare Best Male Playback Award is given by the Filmfare magazine for best playback singer as part of its annual Filmfare Awards for Tamil films. The award was first presented in 2005 with Karthik as winner.

Superlatives

Winners
Here is a list of the award winners and the films for which they won.

Nominations

2000s
2008: Naresh Iyer for "Mundhinam Partheney" from Vaaranam Aayiram
Belly Raj for "Kangal Irandal" from Subramaniapuram
Hariharan for "Nenjukkul peidhidum" from Varanam Aayiram
Karthik for "Oru Naalaikul" from Yaaradi Nee Mohini
Krish for "Adiye Kolludhey" from Varanam Aayiram
Vijay Antony for "Naaka Mukka" from Kadhalil Vizhunthen

2009: Karthik for "Hasile Fisile" from Aadhavan
Harish Raghavendra for "Nenje Nenje" from Ayan
Karthik for "Vizhi Moodi" from Ayan
Krish for "Chinna Thamarai" from Vettaikaaran
Naresh Iyer for "Oru Vetkam" from Pasanga
Tippu for "Vaada Maapla" from Villu

2010s
2010: Karthik for "Usure Poguthey" from Raavanan
Dhanush for "Un Mele Aasathan" from Aayirathil Oruvan
Rahul Nambiar for "Adadaa Mazhadaa" from Paiyaa
Udit Narayan for "Vaama Duraiamma" from Madrasapattinam
Vijay Prakash for "Hosanna" from Vinnaithaandi Varuvaaya
Yuvan Shankar Raja for "Iragai Poley" from Naan Mahaan Alla

2011: Aalap Raju for "Enamo Aedho" from Ko
 G. V. Prakash Kumar for "Yathe Yathe" from Aadukalam
 Karthik for "Mun Andhi" from 7aum Arivu
 Richard for "Nangai" from Engeyum Kadhal
 S. P. Balasubrahmanyam for "Yamma Yamma" from 7aum Arivu

2012: Dhanush for "Why This Kolaveri" from 3
 D. Imman for "Onnum Puriyale" from Kumki
 G. V. Prakash Kumar for "Para Para" from Neerparavai
 Karthik for "Katrai Konjam" from Neethane En Ponvasantham
 Vijay Yesudas for "Nee Partha Vizigal" from 3

2013
 A. R. Rahman for "Elay Keechan" from Kadal
 Abhay Jodhpurkar for "Moongil Thottam" from Kadal
 G. V. Prakash Kumar for "Yaar Indha Saalai Oram" from Thalaivaa
 Sriram Parthasarathy for "Anandha Yaazhai" from Thanga Meengal
 Yuvan Shankar Raja for "Kadal Rasa Naan" from Maryan

2014 
 Anirudh Ravichander for "Un Vizhigalil" from Maan Karate
 Haricharan for "Sandi Kuthirai" from Kaaviya Thalaivan
 Karthik for "Ovvondrai Thirudigarai" from Jeeva
 Pradeep Kumar for "Aagayam Theepidicha" from Madras
 Vijay for "Selfie Pulla" from Kaththi

2015: Sid Sriram – "Ennodu Nee Irundhaal" from I

 Anirudh Ravichander – "Thangamey" from Naanum Rowdy Dhaan
 A. R. Rahman – "Mental Manadhil" from OK Kanmani
 Dhanush – "Oh Ohh" from Thanga Magan
 Vijay – "Yeandi Yeandi" from Puli

2016: Sundarayyar – "Jasmine U" from Joker

 Anirudh Ravichander – "Senjittaley" from Remo
 Arunraja Kamaraj – "Neruppu Da" from Kabali
 Jithin Raj – "Yedho Mayam" from Wagah
 Sid Sriram – "Mei Nigara" from 24

2017: Anirudh Ravichander – "Yaanji" from Vikram Vedha

 A. R. Rahman – "Neethane" from Mersal
 Arjun Chandy & Haricharan – "Azhagiye" from Kaatru Veliyidai
 Sathyaprakash – "Nee Parkum" from Thiruttu Payale 2
 Sid Sriram – "Macho" from Mersal

2018: Sid Sriram for "Hey Penne" from Pyaar Prema Kaadhal
 Anirudh Ravichandran for "Kalyana Vayasu" from Kolamavu Kokila
 Anthony Daasan for "Sodakku" from Thaana Serndha Kootam
 Dhanush for "Rowdy Baby" from Maari 2
 Raghu Dixit, Sathyaprakash D, Jithin Raj for "Neeyum Naanum" from Imaikkaa Nodigal
2020-2021 : Christin Jos and Govind Vasantha – "Aagasam" from Soorarai Pottru
 Arivu – "Vaathi Raid" from Master
 Bharath Sankar – "Mandela Tribute" from Mandela
 	Kapil Kapilan – "Adiye" from Bachelor
 Sid Sriram – "Kadhaippoma" from Oh My Kadavule
 Vijay – "Kutti Story" from Master

External links

Filmfare Awards South (Tamil)